The 2016 Minnesota Republican presidential caucuses took place on March 1 in the U.S. state of Minnesota, during the Super Tuesday contests, as a part of the Republican Party's series of presidential primaries. It is notable because it is the only state that was won by Florida Senator Marco Rubio. It was one of the only states in which Donald Trump got 3rd place.

Marco Rubio was considered the favorite to win Minnesota, due to the caucus nature of the contest and the high proportion of college-educated voters.

The Democratic Party held its Minnesota caucuses on the same day.

Polling

Results
Precinct Caucuses date: March 1, 2016
State Convention: May 20–21, 2016
National delegates: 38

Delegates were awarded to candidates at the statewide and congressional district level who got at least 10% or 10% or more of the vote proportionally.

References

Minnesota
2016 Minnesota elections
Minnesota Republican caucuses
March 2016 events in the United States